Monopis argillacea is a moth of the family Tineidae first described by Edward Meyrick in 1893. It is found in Australia and New Zealand.

References

Hieroxestinae
Moths described in 1893
Moths of New Zealand
Moths of Australia
Taxa named by Edward Meyrick